Mycosphaerella rosicola is a fungal plant pathogen that causes leaf spot of rose.

See also
 List of Mycosphaerella species

References

Fungal plant pathogens and diseases
Rose diseases
rosicola
Fungi described in 1937